The Marked Men is the eponymous debut album by the Denton, Texas punk rock band The Marked Men, released May 20, 2003 by Rip Off Records and Dirtnap Records.

Track listing

Personnel 
Jeff Burke – guitar, lead vocals
Mark Ryan – guitar, lead vocals
Joe Ayoub – bass guitar
Mike Throneberry – drum kit
Jim Kuckowski – mastering
Mark Ryan and Dana Harper – photos and cover design
Recorded and mixed by The Marked Men

References

2003 debut albums
The Marked Men albums